Rowby-John Rodriguez (born 27 March 1994) is an Austrian professional darts player currently playing in events of the Professional Darts Corporation (PDC).

Career
In 2010, as a 16-year-old, Rodriguez won the Austrian National Championship by beating Franz Thaler 5–0 in the final.

At the second event of Q School in January 2014 he stood one win away from joining the PDC but lost 5–3 to Gerwyn Price. However, after all four events had been played Rodriguez had done enough to finish ninth on the Q School Order of Merit and earn a two-year tour card. His first PDC major was the UK Open where he was knocked out 5–1 by Tony Randall in the first round.

In May, Rodriguez reached the final of the PDC World Youth Championship where he lost 6–4 to Keegan Brown at the O2 Arena in London as part of the Premier League finals night. Reaching the final secured him a place in the 2014 Grand Slam of Darts. Rodriguez was now Austria's number two player behind Mensur Suljović and they teamed up at the World Cup of Darts, but lost both their singles matches in the second round against the Belgium brothers of Kim and Ronny Huybrechts. Rodriguez reached the quarter-finals of a Pro Tour event for the first time at the 14th Players Championship defeating the likes of Gary Anderson, Paul Nicholson and Jamie Caven, before losing 6–1 to Ian White. His play throughout the year earned him a debut in the European Championship where he lost 6–2 to Robert Thornton in the opening round. At the Grand Slam, Rodriguez beat world number three Adrian Lewis 5–2 in his opening group game before losing 5–1 to Dave Chisnall. He went into his final group game knowing a win over Brown would see him qualify for the last 16 and, despite coming back from 3–0 down to level at 3–3, he lost 5–3.

2015 season
Rodriguez made his debut at the 2015 World Championship after he qualified through the Pro Tour Order of Merit. However, he ran into an in-form Raymond van Barneveld who hit finishes of 167 and 170 as he restricted Rodriguez to two legs during the match in a 3–0 defeat. Rodriguez averaged 79.22 which was over 20 points lower than his opponent's, but he still broke into the top 64 on the Order of Merit for the first time after the tournament concluded as he was ranked world number 58. He won the opening Development Tour event of the year by beating Jamie Lewis 4–1 in the final.
Rodriguez and Suljović were eliminated in the last 16 of the World Cup for the second consecutive year, this time to Germany. From the last 32 onwards he knocked out Kim Huybrechts, Wayne Jones and Mensur Suljović at the 14th Players Championship to play in his first PDC Pro Tour semi-final, where he lost 6–2 against Jelle Klaasen. A 6–4 win over Christian Kist saw Rodriguez make the second round of the European Championship in which he could only average 73.43 against John Henderson in a 10–2 defeat. After losing 5–3 to Robbie Green and beating Martin Phillips 5–2 at the Grand Slam, Rodriguez needed a win over Phil Taylor to qualify for the last 16, but he lost 5–2.

2016 season
Rodriguez hit the first 170 finish of the  2016 World Championship, but lost each of the three sets played against Dave Chisnall in the first round by deciding legs.
He reached the quarter-finals of the first UK Open Qualifier, but was beaten 6–1 by Adrian Lewis and he lost 6–2 to Lee Evans in the second round of the main event. Rodriguez was defeated in the final of three Development Tour events in 2016.

Rodriguez and Mensur Suljović eliminated Italy and Singapore to ensure Austria played in their first World Cup quarter-final, where Suljović was whitewashed by Phil Taylor and Rodriguez lost 4–1 to Adrian Lewis. A couple of quarter-finals out of the 20 Players Championship events qualified him for the Finals and he beat Ronny Huybrechts 6–4, before being thrashed 6–0 by Joe Cullen in the second round.

2017 season
Rodriguez squared his first round match with Dave Chisnall at the 2017 World Championship at two sets apiece, but lost all three legs of the decider. Austria played England in the quarter-finals of the 2017 World Cup for the second successive year. Mensur Suljović thrashed Adrian Lewis 4–0 and Rodriguez lost 4–1 to Chisnall, before Austria were defeated 4–2 in the decisive doubles match.

2022 European Darts Matchplay 
Rodriguez made his first final at a Euro Tour tournament by beating Danny Noppert, Gerwyn Price, Gabriel Clemens, Nathan Aspinall and Madars Razma at the 2022 European Darts Matchplay in Trier. In the final he met Luke Humphries, who already won three Euro Tour tournaments earlier that year. Rodriguez missed a match dart in the deciding leg, after which the Englishman won with 8-7.

World Championship results

PDC
 2015: First round (lost to Raymond van Barneveld 0–3)
 2016: First round (lost to Dave Chisnall 0–3)
 2017: First round (lost to Dave Chisnall 2–3)
 2019: Second round (lost to Cristo Reyes 2–3)
 2020: First round (lost to Noel Malicdem 0–3)
 2022: Second round (lost to Luke Humphries 0–3)
 2023: First round (lost to Lourence Ilagan 2–3)

Performance timeline

PDC European Tour

Personal life
Rodriguez' older brother Roxy-James Rodriguez also plays darts and reached the last 16 of the European Darts Trophy in 2014. His other younger brother, Rusty-Jake Rodriguez is also a darts player and made his PDC European Tour debut in the 2017 Austrian Darts Open.

References

External links

1994 births
Professional Darts Corporation current tour card holders
Austrian darts players
Living people
Sportspeople from Vienna
PDC World Cup of Darts Austrian team
21st-century Austrian people